Turbo is the fifth album by the ska/soul band The Pietasters. It was released in 2002 (see 2002 in music).

Track listing
 "Told You the First Time" (Pezzimenti/Jackson) – 2:28
 "Set Me Up" (Pezzimenti/Jackson) – 2:51
 "Drunken Master" (Morgan/Selah) – 4:01
 "Rachel" (Pezzimenti/Jackson) – 3:22
 "Mellow Mood" (Bob Marley) – 2:21
 "Every Afternoon" (Hansen) – 3:19
 "Got to Stay" (Pezzimenti/Jackson) – 3:42
 "Step Right Up" (Morgan) – 3:17
 "Wrong With You" (Linares) – 2:39
 "Trust Yourself" (Pezzimenti/Jackson) – 3:36
 "Nothing Good to Eat" (Vic Ruggiero) – 2:44
 "Malmo" (Pezzimenti/Jackson/Roberts) – 2:27
 "How We Were Before" (Colin Blunstone) – 3:05

Personnel
 Stephen Jackson - vocals
 Toby Hansen - guitar
 Jorge Pezzimenti - bass guitar
 Rob Steward - drums
 Alan Makranczy - sax
 Jeremy Roberts - trombone
 Carlos Linares - trumpet
 Erick Morgan - keyboards
 DJ Selah - additional vocals and chat
 Hayes Smith - baritone sax
 Todd Eckhardt - bass guitar on track 5
 Tom Goodin - guitar on track 5
 Jeb Crandall - keyboards on track 5
 Todd Harris - production
 Rich Isaac - engineering
 Seth Foster - mastering

References

2002 albums
The Pietasters albums